Stephen Fowler may refer to:
Stephen Fowler (Wife Swap)
Stephen L. Fowler (born 1948), American electrical engineer 
Stephen Fowler (singer), American Idol contestant
Steven J Fowler (born 1983), English poet, writer and avant-garde artist